The Shaking the Habitual Tour is a concert tour by Swedish electronic music duo The Knife in support of their album Shaking the Habitual. It is their first live appearance in seven years since the Silent Shout Tour in 2006, as well as their final tour.

Background
When asked about the live shows in interviews The Knife had repeatedly been unforthcoming. Filter asked 'Can you tell us what the live show will be like?' and Karin responded 'That is a huge secret'.
It was, however, revealed in an interview with The Guardian that the live shows have 'been devised in collaboration with an all-female collective of choreographers and set designers'. Karin also told Spin "it has to be fun, and we should enjoy the process. I think we will show some humor in our live show".

On 22 April 2013, The Knife posted details about the show on their website revealing that a handful of the European shows would begin with 'DEEP Aerobics' (short for "Death Electro Emo Protest Aerobics") and the shows in Stockholm with Cool Pans, "the biggest steel band in Scandinavia" and  "Danceoke", organized by artist collective and feminist support group Öfa-Kollektivet.

The post also identified the members of Shaking The Habitual Show Team (aka Sorkklubben):

Adena Asovic, Anna Efraimsson, Andrea Svensson, Bella Rune, Erika Niklasson, Halla Olafsdottir, Iwa Herdensjö, Jonas Nobel, Karin Dreijer, Kim Einarsson, Jesper Ekholm Strömbäck, Laura Davis, Lotje Horvers, Lucie Barinkova, Marcus Baldemar, Maryam Nikandish, Nicole Lattimore, Olof Dreijer, Rami Jawhari Jansson, Sharon ‘Bamo’ Bampton, Stina Nyberg, SUTODA, Thomas Romlöv and Zoë Poluch.

Set list

Some songs are played live while others are live recordings or album tracks which the group dance to.

2013 Setlist

2014 Setlist

Critical reception
The live show has received positive to mixed reviews from critics and fans. The Independent praised and defended the show, giving it 5 out of 5 stars noting that "some people just can’t stand to have their boundaries gently nuzzled, let alone pushed" and "The Knife have caused uproar merely by... taking themselves out of centre stage". The Quietus called the show "a triumph of displacement and mistaken identity" emphasising "performance's endless capacity for disruption". The Guardian said "far from a joyless exercise in conceptualism, this is an absurdist sci-fi rave, complete with retro-futurist instruments, strobe lights and glow-sticks".

The Evening Standard gave the show 2 stars out of 5 saying "The Knife's comeback defied expectations, and was frequently fun, but mostly it felt like the joke was on us". MTV said "'challenging', unconventional' and even 'uncomfortable' are all things we have come to not only expect but demand from The Knife, but tonight's performance ultimately just failed to cut it".
Some fans left negative reviews on Last.fm calling it "an amateurish dance show".

In an interview with The Quietus, Olof Dreijer responded to the criticism, saying "We are on stage like this – if people don't like that, it's fine" and "it's important to say that many of the things we do on stage have previously been done within the comfort zone of the queer community. We have years of drag, voguing and miming behind us – but they have been done within a group that wants that and reconfirms it. Whereas now The Knife have ended up in a bit more of a mainstream situation where there are people outside this comfort zone, who might not be socialist or feminist or queer. It's not so strange for us.

Tour dates

References

2013 concert tours
2014 concert tours